Armadillidium is a genus of the small terrestrial crustacean known as the woodlouse. Armadillidium are also commonly known as pill woodlice, leg pebbles, pill bugs, roly-poly, or potato bugs, and are often confused with pill millipedes such as Glomeris marginata. They are characterised by their ability to roll into a ball ("volvation") when disturbed.

Distribution and habitat
They typically feed on moss, algae, bark and other decaying organic matter. They are usually found in moist areas such as decomposing leaf matter and soil. Armadillidium vulgare is the most abundant species in Europe and has been introduced worldwide. However, the vast majority of species are endemic to small regions close to the Mediterranean Sea, in much lower numbers than common species such as A. vulgare, and hence are understudied.

Description
Unlike other terrestrial arthropods such as insects and spiders, pill bugs do not have a waxy cuticle that would reduce evaporation from their bodies. Pill bugs also use modified lungs, called pseudotrachea, for respiration, and the lungs must remain moist to function. Individual pill bugs typically live for two or three years, and females brood eggs once or twice each summer. Several hundred eggs are brooded at a time in the marsupium, a pocket on the ventral side of the female pill bug. The marsupium must also be kept filled with water until the young hatch and crawl away.

The colouration especially of young A. klugii resembles the red hourglass marking of the Mediterranean black widow Latrodectus tredecimguttatus. This is probably a kind of mimicry, to ward off predators that mistake the harmless animal for a venomous spider.

Species

There are 189 recognised species in the genus Armadillidium:

 Armadillidium absoloni Strouhal, 1939 
 Armadillidium aegaeum Strouhal, 1929 
 Armadillidium aelleni Caruso & Ferrara, 1982 
 Armadillidium alassiense Verhoeff, 1910 
 Armadillidium albigauni Arcangeli, 1935 
 Armadillidium albomarginatum Verhoeff, 1901 
 Armadillidium album Dollfus, 1887 
 Armadillidium ameglioi Arcangeli, 1914 
 Armadillidium amicorum Rodríguez & Vicente, 1993 
 Armadillidium anconanum Verhoeff, 1928 
 Armadillidium apenninigenum Verhoeff, 1936 
 Armadillidium apenninorum Verhoeff, 1928 
 Armadillidium apfelbecki Dollfus, 1895 
 Armadillidium apuanum Taiti & Ferrara, 1995 
 Armadillidium arcadicum Verhoeff, 1902 
 Armadillidium arcangelii Strouhal, 1929 
 Armadillidium argentarium Verhoeff, 1931 
 Armadillidium argolicum Verhoeff, 1907 
 Armadillidium artense Strouhal, 1956 
 Armadillidium assimile Budde-Lund, 1885 
 Armadillidium atticum Strouhal, 1929 
 Armadillidium azerbaidzhanum Schmalfuss, 1990 
 Armadillidium badium Budde-Lund, 1885 
 Armadillidium baldense Verhoeff, 1902 
 Armadillidium banaticum Verhoeff, 1907 
 Armadillidium beieri Strouhal, 1937 
 Armadillidium bensei Schmalfuss, 2006 
 Armadillidium bicurvatum Verhoeff, 1901 
 Armadillidium bosniense Strouhal, 1939 
 Armadillidium boukorninense Hamaied, Charfi-Cheikhrouha & Lombardo, 2018 
 Armadillidium brentanum Verhoeff, 1931 
 Armadillidium bulgaricum Frankenberger, 1941 
 Armadillidium calabricum Verhoeff, 1908 
 Armadillidium canaliferum Verhoeff, 1908 
 Armadillidium capreae Verhoeff, 1944 
 Armadillidium carniolense Verhoeff, 1901 
 Armadillidium carynthiacum Verhoeff, 1939 
 Armadillidium cavannai Arcangeli, 1960 
 Armadillidium cephalonicum Strouhal, 1929 
 Armadillidium chazaliei Dollfus, 1896 
 Armadillidium clausi Verhoeff, 1901 
 Armadillidium clavigerum Verhoeff, 1928 
 Armadillidium corcyraeum Verhoeff, 1901 
 Armadillidium cruzi Garcia, 2003 
 Armadillidium cythereium Strouhal, 1937 
 Armadillidium dalmaticum Strouhal, 1939 
 Armadillidium decorum Brandt, 1833 
 Armadillidium delattini Verhoeff, 1943 
 Armadillidium depressum Brandt, 1833 
 Armadillidium djebalensis Vandel, 1958 
 Armadillidium dollfusi Verhoeff, 1902 
 Armadillidium elysii Verhoeff, 1936 
 Armadillidium epiroticum Strouhal, 1956 
 Armadillidium espanyoli Cruz, 1990 
 Armadillidium esterelanum Dollfus, 1887 
 Armadillidium etruriae Ferrara & Taiti, 1978 
 Armadillidium euxinum Verhoeff, 1929 
 Armadillidium fallax Brandt, 1833 
 Armadillidium ficalbii Arcangeli, 1911 
 Armadillidium flavoscutatum Strouhal, 1927 
 Armadillidium fossuligerum Verhoeff, 1902 
 Armadillidium frontemarginatum Strouhal, 1927 
 Armadillidium frontetriangulum Verhoeff, 1901 
 Armadillidium furcatum Budde-Lund, 1885 
 Armadillidium galiciense Schmölzer, 1955 
 Armadillidium germanicum Verhoeff, 1901 
 Armadillidium gestroi Tua, 1900 
 Armadillidium ghardalamensis Caruso & Hili, 1991 
 Armadillidium gionum Schmalfuss, 2012 
 Armadillidium granulatum Brandt, 1833 
 Armadillidium grimmi Schmalfuss, 2006 
 Armadillidium hauseni Schmalfuss, 1985 
 Armadillidium herzegowinense Verhoeff, 1907 
 Armadillidium hessei Verhoeff, 1930 
 Armadillidium hirtum Budde-Lund, 1885 
 Armadillidium humectum Strouhal, 1937 
 Armadillidium ichkeuli Hamaied & Charfi-Cheikhrouha, 2017 
 Armadillidium insulanum Verhoeff, 1907 
 Armadillidium irmengardis Strouhal, 1956 
 Armadillidium janinense Verhoeff, 1902 
 Armadillidium jaqueti Dollfus, 1897 
 Armadillidium jerrentrupi Schmalfuss, 2008 
 Armadillidium jonicum Strouhal, 1927 
 Armadillidium justi Strouhal, 1937 
 Armadillidium kalamatense Verhoeff, 1907 
 Armadillidium kalamium Strouhal, 1956 
 Armadillidium klaptoczi Verhoeff, 1908 
 Armadillidium klugii Brandt, 1833 
 Armadillidium kochi Dollfus, 1887 
 Armadillidium kossuthi Arcangeli, 1929 
 Armadillidium kuehnelti Schmalfuss, 2006 
 Armadillidium laconicum Strouhal, 1938 
 Armadillidium lagrecai Vandel, 1969 
 Armadillidium laminigerum Verhoeff, 1907 
 Armadillidium lanzai Taiti & Ferrara, 1996 
 Armadillidium littorale Taiti & Ferrara, 1996 
 Armadillidium lobocurvum Verhoeff, 1902 
 Armadillidium lymberakisi Schmalfuss, Paragamian & Sfenthourakis, 2004 
 Armadillidium maccagnoae Arcangeli, 1960 
 Armadillidium maculatum Risso, 1816 
 Armadillidium maniatum Schmalfuss, 2006 
 Armadillidium mareoticum Budde-Lund, 1885 
 Armadillidium marinense Verhoeff, 1902 
 Armadillidium marinensium Verhoeff, 1928 
 Armadillidium marmoratum Strouhal, 1929 
 Armadillidium marmorivagum Verhoeff, 1934 
 Armadillidium mateui Vandel, 1953 
 Armadillidium messenicum Verhoeff, 1902 
 Armadillidium meteorense Schmalfuss, 2012 
 Armadillidium mohamedanicum Verhoeff, 1929 
 Armadillidium nahumi Garcia, 2020 
 Armadillidium narentanum Verhoeff, 1907 
 Armadillidium nasatum Budde-Lund, 1885 
 Armadillidium niger Kortshagin, 1887 
 Armadillidium nigrum Arcangeli, 1956 
 Armadillidium obenbergi Frankenberger, 1941 
 Armadillidium odhneri Verhoeff, 1930 
 Armadillidium oglasae Ferrara & Taiti, 1978 
 Armadillidium omblae Verhoeff, 1900 
 Armadillidium opacum (C. Koch, 1841) 
 Armadillidium ormeanum Verhoeff, 1931 
 Armadillidium paeninsulae Ferrara & Taiti, 1978 
 Armadillidium pallasii Brandt, 1833 
 Armadillidium pallidum Verhoeff, 1907 
 Armadillidium pangaionum Schmalfuss, 2008 
 Armadillidium panningi Strouhal, 1937 
 Armadillidium pardoi Vandel, 1956 
 Armadillidium pelionense Strouhal, 1928 
 Armadillidium peloponnesiacum Verhoeff, 1901 
 Armadillidium peraccae Tua, 1900 
 Armadillidium petralonense Schmalfuss, 2008 
 Armadillidium phalacronum Schmalfuss, 2008 
 Armadillidium pictum Brandt, 1833 
 Armadillidium pieperi Schmalfuss, 2008 
 Armadillidium pilosellum Dollfus, 1896 
 Armadillidium ponalense Verhoeff, 1934 
 Armadillidium portofinense Verhoeff, 1908 
 Armadillidium pretusi Cruz, 1990 
 Armadillidium pseudassimile Taiti & Ferrara, 1980 
 Armadillidium pseudovulgare Verhoeff, 1902 
 Armadillidium pulchellum (Zenker, 1798) 
 Armadillidium quinquepustulatum Budde-Lund, 1885 
 Armadillidium rhodopinum Verhoeff, 1936 
 Armadillidium rojanum Verhoeff, 1936 
 Armadillidium rosai Arcangeli, 1913 
 Armadillidium ruffoi Arcangeli, 1940 
 Armadillidium rupium Verhoeff, 1928 
 Armadillidium sanctum Dollfus, 1892 
 Armadillidium savonense Verhoeff, 1931 
 Armadillidium saxivagum Verhoeff, 1901 
 Armadillidium scaberrimum Stein, 1859 
 Armadillidium scabrum Dollfus, 1892 
 Armadillidium schmalfussi Caruso & Lombardo, 1982 
 Armadillidium serrai Cruz & Dalens, 1990 
 Armadillidium serratum Budde-Lund, 1885 
 Armadillidium sfenthourakisi Schmalfuss, 2008 
 Armadillidium siculorum Verhoeff, 1908 
 Armadillidium silvestrii Verhoeff, 1931 
 Armadillidium simile Strouhal, 1937 
 Armadillidium simoni Dollfus, 1887 
 Armadillidium sordidum Dollfus, 1887 
 Armadillidium stagnoense Verhoeff, 1902 
 Armadillidium steindachneri Strouhal, 1927 
 Armadillidium stolikanum Verhoeff, 1907 
 Armadillidium storkani Frankenberger, 1941 
 Armadillidium strinatii Vandel, 1961 
 Armadillidium stymphalicum Schmalfuss, 2006 
 Armadillidium sulcatum Milne-Edwards, 1840 
 Armadillidium tabacarui Gruia, Iavorschi & Sarbu, 1994 
 Armadillidium teramense Verhoeff, 1933 
 Armadillidium tigris Budde-Lund, 1885 
 Armadillidium tirolense Verhoeff, 1901 
 Armadillidium torchiai Taiti & Ferrara, 1996 
 Armadillidium traiani Demianowicz, 1932 
 Armadillidium tripolitzense Verhoeff, 1902 
 Armadillidium tuberculatum Schmalfuss, 2008 
 Armadillidium tunisiense Hamaïed & Charfi-Cheikhrouha, 2007 
 Armadillidium tyrrhenum Taiti & Ferrara, 1980 
 Armadillidium vallombrosae Verhoeff, 1907 
 Armadillidium valonae Arcangeli, 1952 
 Armadillidium verhoeffi Rogenhofer, 1915 
 Armadillidium versicolor Stein, 1859 
 Armadillidium versluysi Strouhal, 1937 
 Armadillidium virgo Caruso & Bouchon, 2011 
 Armadillidium vulgare (Latreille, 1804) 
 Armadillidium werneri Strouhal, 1927 
 Armadillidium xerovunense Strouhal, 1956 
 Armadillidium zangherii Arcangeli, 1923 
 Armadillidium zenckeri Brandt, 1833

See also
 Johann Friedrich von Brandt
 Karl Wilhelm Verhoeff

References

Woodlice
Isopod genera
Taxa named by Johann Friedrich von Brandt